Suzanne Nadine Vega ( Peck; born July 11, 1959) is an American singer-songwriter best known for her folk-inspired music. Vega's music career spans almost 40 years. She came to prominence in the mid-1980s, releasing four singles that entered the Top 40 charts in the UK during the 1980s and 1990s, including "Marlene on the Wall", "Left of Center", "Luka" and "No Cheap Thrill". "Tom's Diner", which was originally released as an a cappella recording on Vega's second studio album, Solitude Standing (1987), was remixed in 1990 as a dance track by English electronic duo DNA with Vega as featured artist, and it became a Top 10 hit in over five countries. The original a cappella recording of the song was used as a test during the creation of the MP3 format. The role of her song in the development of the MP3 compression prompted Vega to be given the title of "The Mother of the MP3".

Vega has released nine studio albums to date, the latest of which is Lover, Beloved: Songs from an Evening with Carson McCullers, released in 2016.

Early life
Suzanne Nadine Vega was born on July 11, 1959, in Santa Monica, California. Her parents divorced soon after her birth. Her mother, Pat Vega (née Schumacher), is a computer systems analyst of German-Swedish heritage. Her father, Richard Peck, is of British origin. Her stepfather, Edgardo Vega Yunqué, also known as Ed Vega, was a writer and teacher from Puerto Rico. When Vega was two and a half, her family moved to New York City.  She grew up in Spanish Harlem and the Upper West Side. She was not aware that Peck was her biological father until she was nine years old. Vega and her father met for the first time in her late 20s, and they remain in contact.

She attended the High School of Performing Arts, now renamed Fiorello H. LaGuardia High School, where she studied modern dance and graduated in 1977.

Career

1980s
While majoring in English literature at Barnard College, she performed in small venues in Greenwich Village, where she was a regular contributor to Jack Hardy's Monday night songwriters' group at the Cornelia Street Cafe and had some of her first songs published on Fast Folk anthology albums. In 1984, she received a major label recording contract, making her one of the first 'Fast Folk' artists to break out on a major label.

Vega's self-titled debut studio album was released in 1985 and was well received by critics in the U.S.; it reached platinum status in the United Kingdom. Produced by Lenny Kaye and Steve Addabbo, the songs feature Vega's acoustic guitar in straightforward arrangements. A video was released for the album's song "Marlene on the Wall", which went into MTV and VH1's rotations. During this period Vega also wrote lyrics for two songs ("Lightning" and "Freezing") on Songs from Liquid Days (1986) by composer Philip Glass.

Vega's song "Left of Center" co-written with Steve Addabbo for the 1986 John Hughes film Pretty in Pink reached No. 32 on the UK Singles Chart in 1986.

Her next studio album, Solitude Standing (1987), garnered critical and commercial success, selling over one million copies in the U.S.  It includes the international hit single "Luka", which is written about, and from the point of view of, an abused child—at the time an uncommon subject for a pop hit. While continuing a focus on Vega's acoustic guitar, the music is more strongly pop-oriented and features fuller arrangements. Following the success of the album, in 1989 Vega became the first female artist to headline the Glastonbury Festival. In addition, the performance was notable for Vega performing her set whilst wearing a bulletproof vest, her band having received death threats from an obsessed fan ahead of the festival.

The a cappella "Tom's Diner" from Solitude Standing became a hit in 1990, having been remixed by two British dance producers under the name DNA. The track was originally a bootleg, until Vega allowed DNA to release it through her record company, and it became her biggest hit.

1990s
Vega's third studio album, Days of Open Hand (1990), continued in the style of her first two studio albums.

In 1992, she released her fourth studio album 99.9F°. It consists of a mixture of folk music, dance beats and industrial music. This record was awarded Gold status by the RIAA in recognition of selling over 500,000 copies in the U.S. The single "Blood Makes Noise" from this album peaked at number-one on Billboards Modern Rock Tracks. Vega later married the album's producer Mitchell Froom.

Her fifth studio album, Nine Objects of Desire, was released in 1996. The music varies between a frugal, simple style and the industrial production of 99.9F°. This album contains "Caramel", featured in the movie The Truth About Cats & Dogs (1996), and later the trailer for the movie Closer (2004). A song not included on that album, "Woman on the Tier", was featured on the soundtrack of the movie Dead Man Walking (1996).

In 1997 she took a singing part on the concept album Heaven & Hell, a musical interpretation of the seven deadly sins by her colleague Joe Jackson, with whom she had already collaborated in 1986 on "Left of Center" from the Pretty in Pink soundtrack (with Vega singing and Jackson playing piano).

In 1999, Avon Books published Vega's book The Passionate Eye: The Collected Writings of Suzanne Vega, a volume of poems, lyrics, essays and journalistic pieces.

2000s
In September 2001, Vega released a new studio album entitled Songs in Red and Gray. Three songs deal with Vega's divorce from her first husband, Mitchell Froom.

At the memorial concert for her brother Tim Vega in December 2002, Vega began her role as the subject of the direct-cinema documentary, Some Journey, directed by Christopher Seufert of Mooncusser Films. The documentary has not been completed.

Underground hip hop duo Felt named a track "Suzanne Vega" on their studio album Felt: A Tribute to Christina Ricci, released in 2002.

In 2003, the 21-song greatest hits compilation album Retrospective: The Best of Suzanne Vega was released. (The UK version of Retrospective included an eight-song bonus CD as well as a DVD containing 12 songs). In the same year she was invited by Grammy Award-winning jazz guitarist Bill Frisell to play at the Century of Song concerts at the famed Ruhrtriennale in Germany.

In 2003, she hosted the American Public Media radio series American Mavericks, about 20th century American composers, which received the Peabody Award for Excellence in Broadcasting.

On August 3, 2006, Vega became the first major recording artist to perform live in the Internet-based virtual world, Second Life.  The event was hosted by John Hockenberry of public radio's The Infinite Mind.

On September 17, 2006, she performed in Central Park, as part of a benefit concert for the Save Darfur Coalition. During the concert she highlighted her support for Amnesty International, of which she has been a member since 1988.

In early October 2006, Vega participated in the Academia Film Olomouc (AFO) in Olomouc, the Czech Republic, the oldest festival of documentary films in Europe, in which she appeared as a main guest. She was invited there as the subject of the documentary film by director Christopher Seufert, that had a test screening at the festival. At the end of the festival she performed her classic songs and added one brand new piece called "New York Is a Woman".

Vega is also interviewed in the book Everything Is Just a Bet which was published in Czech in October 2006. The book contains 12 interview transcriptions from the talk show called Stage Talks that regularly runs in the Švandovo divadlo (Švandovo Theatre) in Prague. Vega introduced the book to the audience of the Švandovo divadlo (Švandovo Theatre), and together with some other Czech celebrities gave a signing session.

She signed a new recording contract with Blue Note Records in the spring of 2006, and released Beauty & Crime on July 17, 2007. The album, produced by Jimmy Hogarth, won a Grammy Award for Best Engineered Album, Non-Classical. Her contract was not renewed and she was released in June 2008.

In 2007, Vega followed the lead of numerous other mainstream artists and released her track "Pornographer's Dream" as podsafe. The song spent two weeks at number-one during 2007 and finished as the No. 11 hit of the year on the PMC Top10's annual countdown. In 2015, Vega joined The 14th Annual Independent Music Awards judging panel to assist independent musicians' careers.

 She was also a judge for the 6th, 7th, 8th, 9th, 10th, 11th, 12th and 13th Independent Music Awards.

In 2008, fire at a Universal Music Group vault in Los Angeles County resulted in the loss or damage of some Vega recordings.

2010s
A partial cover version of her song "Tom's Diner" was used to introduce the 2010 British movie 4.3.2.1., with its lyrics largely rewritten to echo the plot. This musical hybrid was released as "Keep Moving". Vega participated in the Danger Mouse and Sparklehorse studio album Dark Night of the Soul (2010). She wrote both melody and lyrics for her song, which is titled "Man Who Played God", inspired by a biography of Spanish artist Pablo Picasso. Vega sang lead vocals on the song "Now I Am an Arsonist" with singer-songwriter Jonathan Coulton on his studio album, Artificial Heart (2011).

Vega has re-recorded her back-catalogue, both for artistic and commercial (and control) reasons, in the Close-up series. Vol. 1 (Love Songs) and Vol. 2 (People & Places) appeared in 2010 while Vol. 3 (States of Being) was released in July 2011 followed by Vol. 4 (Songs of Family) in September 2012.  Volumes 2, 3 and 4 of the Close-Up albums included previously unrecorded material; Volumes 2 and 3 each included one new collaboratively written song, while Volume 4 included three songs that Vega had written years earlier, but had not previously gotten around to recording. In all, Vega's Close-Up series features 60 re-recorded songs and five new compositions, representing about three-quarters of her lifetime songwriting output.

While performing live, Vega and long-term collaborator Gerry Leonard began to introduce a number of new songs into the setlist, including the live favorite "I Never Wear White". Over the course of a year, the songs were completed and recorded in a live-studio setting with the help of a number of guests. Produced by Leonard, Tales from the Realm of the Queen of Pentacles was released in February 2014. It was her first album of new material in seven years and became Vega's first studio album to reach the UK Top 40 since 1992, peaking at No. 37.

Vega's ninth studio album, Lover, Beloved: Songs from an Evening with Carson McCullers, was released on October 14, 2016.

2020s
In February and March 2023, Vega will be touring the UK.

Songwriting
At the age of nine she began to write poetry. She was encouraged to do so by her stepfather. It took her three years to write her first song, "Brother Mine", which was finished at the age of 14. It was first published on Close-Up Vol. 4, Songs of Family (2012), along with her other early song, "The Silver Lady".

Vega has not learned to read musical notes; she sees the melody as a shape and chords as colors. She focuses on lyrics and melodic ideas; for advanced features – like intros or bridges – she relies on other artists with whom she works. Most of her albums, except the first one, were made in such cooperation.

Vega finishes 80% of the songs she starts writing. She got the melody of "Tom's Diner" while walking down Broadway in New York. She was thinking of French New Wave films.  

The most important artistic influences on her work come from Lou Reed, Bob Dylan and Leonard Cohen. Some other important artists for her are Paul Simon and Laura Nyro.

 Theater 
Vega and Duncan Sheik wrote a play Carson McCullers Talks About Love, about the life of the writer Carson McCullers. In the play directed by Kay Matschullat, which premiered in 2011, Vega alternates between monologue and songs. Vega and Sheik were nominated for Outstanding Music in a Play for the 57th annual Drama Desk awards.

The album Lover, Beloved: Songs from an Evening with Carson McCullers, based on this play, was released in 2016. Vega considers it to be a third version, because it's rewritten, and she made the first version in college.

In early 2020, Vega played the role of "Band Leader" in an off-Broadway musical based on the 1969 movie Bob & Carol & Ted & Alice, directed by Scott Elliott and produced at The New Group in New York City.  She replaced Sheik, who wrote the show's music and co-wrote the lyrics with Amanda Green.  In his review for The New York Times, critic Ben Brantley called the "brandy-voiced" Vega "a delightful, smoothly sardonic presence.

Amanuensis Productions
Vega established her own recording label after the 2008 economic crisis. From that point, she stopped working for Blue Note Records and started thinking about re-recording her back catalog with new arrangements and gaining control over her works (which she eventually did with the 2014 Close-Up Series).

The name "Amanuensis Productions" was meant as a private joke about "servant" (amanuensis) owning the "masters" (recording masters), also a pun at A&M still legally owning her previous master tapes.

Running the label proved to be harder than she expected. In 2015, it barely "broke even", but new licenses were coming for "Tom's Diner".

Personal life
On March 17, 1995, Vega married Mitchell Froom, a musician and a record producer (who played on and produced 99.9F° and Nine Objects of Desire). They have a daughter, Ruby Froom (born July 8, 1994). The band Soul Coughing's debut studio album Ruby Vroom (1994) was named for her, with Vega's approval. Vega and Froom separated and divorced in 1998.

On February 11, 2006, Vega married Paul Mills, a lawyer and poet, "22 years after he first proposed to her."

Beginning in 2010, Ruby has occasionally performed with her mother on tour.

Vega practices Nichiren Buddhism and is a member of the American branch of the worldwide Buddhist association Soka Gakkai International.

Awards and nominations
{| class=wikitable
|-
! Year !! Awards !! Work !! Category !! Result
|-
| 1985
| rowspan=8|Billboard Music Awards
| rowspan=5|Herself
| rowspan=2|Top Billboard 200 Artist - Female
| 
|-
| rowspan=8|1987
| 
|-
| Top Billboard 200 Artist
| 
|-
| Top Hot 100 Artist
| 
|-
| Top Hot 100 Artist - Female
| 
|-
| rowspan=2|Solitude Standing
| Top Billboard 200 Album
| 
|-
| Top Pop Compact Disk
| 
|-
| "Luka"
| Top Hot 100 Song
| 
|-
| NME Awards
| rowspan="2" | Herself
| Best Female Singer
| 
|-
| rowspan="8" | 1988
| Pollstar Concert Industry Awards
| Small Hall Tour of the Year
| 
|-
| ASCAP Pop Music Awards
| rowspan="7" | "Luka"
| Most Performed Song
| 
|-
| rowspan="3" | MTV Video Music Awards
| Best Female Video
| 
|-
| Breakthrough Video
| 
|-
| Best Cinematography
| 
|-
| rowspan="5" | Grammy Awards
| Song of the Year
| 
|-
| Record of the Year
| 
|-
| Best Female Pop Vocal Performance
| 
|-
| rowspan="2" | 1990
| rowspan="2" | Days of Open Hand
| Best Contemporary Folk Recording
| 
|-
| Best Album Package
| 
|-
| 1992
| Billboard Music Video Awards
| "Blood Makes Noise"
| Best Pop/Rock Female Video
| 
|-
| 1993
| New York Music Awards
| 99.9F°
| Best Rock Album
| 
|-
| 1996
| Žebřík Music Awards
| rowspan="3" | Herself
| Best International Female
| 
|-
| 2003
| Glamour Awards
| Woman of the Year
| 
|-
| 2004
| Peabody Awards
| Entertainment
| 
|-
| 2008
| Grammy Awards
| Beauty & Crime
| Best Engineered Album, Non-Classical
| 
|-
| 2010
| New York Music Awards
| Close-Up Vol. 1, Love Songs
| Best Pop/Rock Compilation
| 
|-
| 2012
| Drama Desk Awards
| Carson McCullers Talks About Love
| Outstanding Music in a Play
| 

DiscographyStudio albums'''
 Suzanne Vega (1985)
 Solitude Standing (1987)
 Days of Open Hand (1990)
 99.9F° (1992)
 Nine Objects of Desire (1996)
 Songs in Red and Gray (2001)
 Beauty & Crime (2007)
 Tales from the Realm of the Queen of Pentacles (2014)
 Lover, Beloved: Songs from an Evening with Carson McCullers (2016)

Books
 The Passionate Eye: The Collected Writing of Suzanne Vega'' (1999) .

References

External links

 
 
 
 
 
 Stories told by Suzanne Vega at The Moth
 Suzanne Vega recording of 'Streets of Laredo' for Pioneers for a Cure

1959 births
A&M Records artists
American women rock singers
American women singer-songwriters
American folk rock musicians
American folk singers
American people of German descent
American people of Swedish descent
American people of Irish descent
American people of English descent
American people of Scottish descent
American rock guitarists
Barnard College alumni
Blue Note Records artists
Fast Folk artists
Feminist musicians
Fiorello H. LaGuardia High School alumni
Folk musicians from New York (state)
Grammy Award winners
Living people
Members of Sōka Gakkai
American Buddhists
Musicians from Santa Monica, California
Singer-songwriters from California
Singers from New York City
American rock songwriters
20th-century American women guitarists
20th-century American guitarists
21st-century American women guitarists
21st-century American guitarists
Guitarists from California
Guitarists from New York City
20th-century American women singers
21st-century American women singers
People from the Upper West Side
People from East Harlem
Cooking Vinyl artists
20th-century American singers
21st-century American singers
Nichiren Buddhists
Singer-songwriters from New York (state)